Lynda Williams (born February 17, 1958) is a Canadian science fiction author and blogger.

Williams' fiction is centered on a series of ten novels set in the fictional Okal Rel Universe and published by Edge Science Fiction and Fantasy Publishing. Additional works by Williams and votary authors writing in her universe are published by the Absolute XPress imprint of Hades Publications, Inc.

She is the founder of the online journal Reflections on Water.

Williams lives in Burnaby, British Columbia where she is a Learning Technology Analyst and Manager for Teaching and Learning Centre at Simon Fraser University.

Lynda has extensive experience in learning technologies and instructional design.

Bibliography

Complete list of works in the Okal Rel series 
 The Courtesan Prince (2005)
 Righteous Anger (2006)
 Pretenders (2008)
 Throne Price (2003)
 Far Arena (2009)
 Avim's Oath (2010)
 Healer's Sword (2012)
 Gathering Storm (2012)
 Holy War (2013)
 Unholy Science (2014)

See also 
2005 in literature

References 
 List of Novels in the Okal Rel Science Fiction Series

External links 
 Reality Skimming
 Dynamic Content in Applied Computing
 Reflections on Water
 EDGE Science Fiction and Fantasy Publishing
 'Making History' (in The Future Fire, issue 5)

1958 births
Living people
Canadian science fiction writers
People in educational technology
Women science fiction and fantasy writers